Třebichovice is a municipality and village in Kladno District in the Central Bohemian Region of the Czech Republic. It has about 600 inhabitants.

Administrative parts
The village of Saky is an administrative part of Třebichovice.

Notable people
Bedřich Neumann (1891–1964), general

References

Villages in Kladno District